In enzymology, a dihydroxyphenylalanine ammonia-lyase (entry deleted) is a non-existing enzyme that catalyzes the chemical reaction

3,4-dihydroxy-L-phenylalanine  trans-caffeate + NH3

Hence, this enzyme has one substrate, 3,4-dihydroxy-L-phenylalanine (L-DOPA), and two products, trans-caffeate and NH3.

This enzyme belongs to the family of lyases, specifically ammonia lyases, which cleave carbon-nitrogen bonds.  The systematic name of this enzyme class is 3,4-dihydroxy-L-phenylalanine ammonia-lyase (trans-caffeate-forming). Other names in common use include beta-(3,4-dihydroxyphenyl)-L-alanine (DOPA) ammonia-lyase, and 3,4-dihydroxy-L-phenylalanine ammonia-lyase.  This enzyme participates in tyrosine metabolism.

References 

 

EC 4.3.1
Enzymes of unknown structure
Hydroxycinnamic acids metabolism